Mynoparmena dilatata is a species of beetle in the family Cerambycidae, and the only species in the genus Mynoparmena. It was described by Per Olof Christopher Aurivillius in 1926.

References

Parmenini
Beetles described in 1926